Kukkikatte is a place located about 3 km from the city of Udupi in the state of Karnataka, India. It is a suburb of the Udupi City. "Kukkuthakatte" is a Tulu word which means a place with mangoes in abundance.
Tulu is very common there

References 

Villages in Udupi district